Honey Creek is a stream in Cole County in central Missouri. It is a tributary of the Moreau River.

Honey Creek most likely was named after the local Honey family.

See also
List of rivers of Missouri

References

Rivers of Cole County, Missouri
Rivers of Missouri